The Oliver Twist Manifesto is the debut album by Luke Haines, released in 2001. It is subtitled (Or) What's Wrong with Popular Culture.

Track listing
 "Rock 'N' Roll Communique No 1"  – 2:05
 "Oliver Twist"  – 3:23
 "Death of Sarah Lucas"  – 2:44
 "Never Work"  – 2:56
 "Discomania"  – 3:34
 "Mr & Mrs Solanas"  – 3:49
 "What Happens When We Die"  – 2:08
 "Christ"  – 3:07
 "The Spook Manifesto"  – 5:44
 "England vs. America"  – 2:44
 "The Oliver Twist Manifesto"  – 4:35

References

2001 debut albums
Luke Haines albums
Hut Records albums